The 1908–09 Georgia Bulldogs basketball team represented the University of Georgia during the 1908–09 college men's basketball season. The team finished the season with an overall record of 6–2.

Schedule

|-

References

Georgia Bulldogs basketball seasons
Georgia
Bulldogs
Bulldogs